The accessory facial motor nucleus is a small cluster of neurons dorsal to the facial motor nucleus in the pontine tegmentum. It has been reported for the human, rat, and mouse.

See also 
Accessory abducens nucleus

References

External links 
 More information at BrainInfo 

Cranial nerve nuclei
Facial nerve
Pons